The Krapina is a Croatian river flowing through Krapina-Zagorje County and Zagreb County. It is a tributary to the Sava. The confluence of the Krapina River and the Sava River is near Zaprešić.

The hydrological parameters of Krapina are regularly monitored in Croatia at Zlatar Bistrica, Bračak and Kupljenovo.

The name "Krapina" is supposed to come from Latin word "carpinus" (of the carp). Another theory is that it comes from Proto-Indo-European *(s)ker (to cut) and *h2ep (water), so that it means "the water that cuts through the valley".

References

Rivers of Croatia